Paula Nadelstern (born 1951, Bronx, NY) is an American artist, quiltmaker, author and teacher known for her kaleidoscope-themed quilts.

Nadelstern has achieved international recognition, including a one-person exhibition at the American Folk Art Museum in New York City in 2009, Kaleidoscope Quilts:  The Art of Paula Nadelstern.  This exhibition marked the first one-person show at that museum of work by a contemporary quilt maker.

One of her quilts is in the permanent collection of the American Folk Art Museum and was included in the exhibition Self-Taught Genius:  Treasures from the American Folk Art Museum, which toured nationally from 2014 to 2017.

She is the author of numerous books including Paula Nadelstern's Kaleidoscope Quilts:  An Artist's Journey Continues;  Kaleidoscope Quilts:  The Workbook; Puzzle Quilts:  Simple Blocks, Complex Fabric;  Kaleidoscopes & Quilts and Snowflakes & Quilts.

Awards 

 New York Foundation for the Arts grants, 2001, 1995
 Bronx Council for the Arts BRIO Awards, 2018, 1996

References 

1951 births
Living people
Quilters
American textile artists
Artists from the Bronx
American quilters
Women textile artists
20th-century American women artists
21st-century American women artists
20th-century American women writers
21st-century American women writers
Writers from the Bronx